Irish Creek (also known as Irish Branch) is a stream in Bourbon and Linn counties, in the U.S. state of Kansas.

A large share of the first settlers being of Irish ancestry caused the name to be selected.

See also
List of rivers of Kansas

References

Rivers of Bourbon County, Kansas
Rivers of Linn County, Kansas
Rivers of Kansas